Island of the Sequined Love Nun  is a novel by American absurdist writer Christopher Moore, published in 1997. It is based partly on the author's personal experiences in Micronesia.

Plot
Tucker (Tuck) Case is a pilot for a cosmetics company, who crashes the company plane while having sex. This event causes Tuck to be blacklisted from flying in the United States, so he accepts a lucrative offer from a doctor-missionary on a remote Micronesian island to transport cargo to and from the island and Japan.

Tuck moves to the island with a Filipino trans woman navigator and a talking fruit bat. There Tuck eventually uncovers a horrible secret harbored by the doctor and his wife, who capitalized on the fact that the island natives are under the influence of a cargo cult that developed as a result of establishment by Allies of an air runway there during World War II.

Shakespearean allusions
In chapter 8, "The Humiliation of the Pilot as a Passenger", Moore alludes to Shakespeare's Hamlet. Tuck is the heir to the Denmark Silverware Corporation, much like Hamlet being the prince. Later Tuck's mother marries his uncle after her husband has a not-so-accidental riding accident resulting in his death.

Tuck is then summoned by an old girlfriend named Zoophilia (similar to Ophelia). While approaching the house in a rage he runs over Zoophilia's father. Zoophilia meets her demise by taking a handful of Prozac and a mouthful of water then drowns in her hot tub, grief-stricken. Before Tuck leaves he is threatened by Zoophilia's brother.

External links
[http://chrismoore.com/love_nun.html Author's webpage for Island of the Sequined Love Nun]

1997 American novels
Absurdist fiction
American fantasy novels
Novels by Christopher Moore
1997 fantasy novels
Novels set in Oceania
Micronesia
Novels set on islands